Wilshire/La Cienega is a heavy-rail subway station in Beverly Hills, California (currently under construction). This D Line station is part of the Los Angeles County Metro Rail system. It's in the design/construction phase of the Purple Line Extension project. Deep tunneling is proceeding westward beneath Wilshire Boulevard from the Fairfax construction site toward the La Cienega station site. Originally the project was slated for completion in 2023. The station's opening is scheduled for 2024.

Station Site & Layout
Located at the NE-corner of Wilshire Boulevard and La Cienega Boulevard, the new, one-story subway station will provide access to the trains below via escalators, elevators, and stairs. Underground, the station will include an upper level concourse for ticketing, and at the level of the tracks a passenger platform for boarding and egress.

The site of the new station was formerly occupied by a Citibank. It was demolished circa 2016 to provide a temporary staging yard. Another staging yard is at the NW-corner of Wilshire and Gale Drive, where Luther Burbank Savings had been located. These yards support the multi-year construction project to extend the subway line and build Wilshire/La Cienega station.

Local attractions
Adjoining the new NE-corner station will be the following.

 On the NW corner, a three-story structure for Cedars-Sinai offices, and a Wells Fargo branch.
 On the SW corner, a ten-story office building, with a Chase branch. On its ninth floor is located the Turkish Consulate.
 On the SE corner, a ten-story, oval-footprint office building. Its architectural panache initially served to advertise itself as the headquarters of Great Western Savings. In a 1997 merger GW was acquired by Washington Mutual Bank. WaMu's branch there was held up in 2003. The branch closed in 2008 following WaMu's purchase by JPMorgan Chase. The building itself was sold by Larry Flynt in 2013 to Douglas Emmett, a listed real estate company. Outside, a large equestrian statue of John Wayne (crafted in Italy) stands near the corner of Wilshire and Hamilton Drive. The building's third floor houses the Brazilian Consulate.

From the site of the new station going south on La Cienega Boulevard a block and a half is the Douglas Fairbanks Center for Motion Picture Study and the Margaret Herrick Library. Across La Cienega to the east is the triangular La Cienega Park. On Wilshire Boulevard two commercial theaters are short walks away: for stage shows to the east the Saban Theatre; for film to the west the Ahrya Fine Arts Theatre by Laemmle. Restaurant Row stretches north along La Cienega.

Notes

Sources
Brittany Boxley, “Plans Announced to Extend the Purple Line”. © USC Annenberg, 2012. News Program. Annenberg TV News. 13 Nov 2012.
Noel T. Braymer, “LA Busy Building over 35 Miles of New Rail Transit over the Next 10 Years.”. © Rail Passenger Association of California & Nevada, 2012. Newsletter. RailPAC. 8 Dec 2012.
Eric Brightwell, “Exploring the Planned Course of the Metro Purple Line Extension”. © KCETLink, 2012. News Program. KCET. 28 Aug 2012. Accessed 2018-11-11.
Elijah Chiland, "A guide to Metro's D Line subway. Formerly known as the Purple Line, the train will eventually reach LA's westside", in Curbed Los Angeles, 12 February 2020. Accessed 2021-05-11.
Thomas Curwen, "Climb inside the massive tunnel 60 feet below downtown L.A.", in the Los Angeles Times,  May 14, 2017. Accessed 2018-12-9.
David Ellis, "JPMorgan buys WaMu. In the biggest bank failure in history, JPMorgan Chase will acquire massive branch network and troubled assets from Washington Mutual for $1.9 Billion", at CNN Money, Sept. 26, 2008. Accessed 2018-11-11.
Erik Hayden, "Larry Flynt sells Hustler HQ for $89 Million", in The Hollywood Reporter, May 15, 2013. Accessed 2018-11-11.
Henry Kamm, "John Wayne Rides Again", in The New York Times, June 24, 1984. Accessed 2018-11-11.
Greg Krikorian and Errin Haines, "1 Killed, 1 Flees in Bank Shoot-out". © in the Los Angeles Times, Feb. 15, 2003.
Joe Linton, "Metro Committee approves $200M cost overrun for Purple Line Extension", la.streetsblog.org, August 21, 2020. Accessed 2020-09-08.
Barry Stavro, "Shareholders approve Great Western merger", in the Los Angeles Times, June 14, 1997. Accessed 2018-11-11.
Gary Wayne, "The John Wayne Statues", at Seeing Stars in Hollywood website, 2018. Accessed 2018-11-11.
Consulate General of Brazil in Los Angeles. Accessed 2018-11-15.
Purple (Line D) Extension Transit Project, Metro website (2022), Accessed 2022-10-25.
Purple Line Extension, "The long awaited Metro Purple Line Subway Extension is now under construction", 'Overview' at Metro.
Turkish Consulate General in Los Angeles. Accessed 2020-08-27.
"Wilshire/La Cienega Station", at Purple Line Extension Project (Summer 2016).

Future Los Angeles Metro Rail stations
Railway stations scheduled to open in 2024